The Coupe Nationale is the top knockout tournament of the Guinean football.

Winners

Number of Wins

References

Football competitions in Guinea
Guinea